Smashing Satellites was a Canadian rock band formed in Toronto, Ontario, Canada by former My Darkest Days guitarist Sal Costa.

History

After releasing two successful albums and selling out arenas with My Darkest Days, Sal Costa decided it was time to go full force and start his own band. On January 4, 2013 My Darkest Days announced Costa's departure and quickly Costa stated he would continue his musical career by forming his own band.

Formation

Throughout the rest of 2013 and the first half of 2014, Costa advertised the group by posting updates on his personal Facebook page. In the summer 2014 Costa changed the page name from his name "Sal Coz Costa" to "Smashing Satellites".

Costa traveled to Los Angeles with song ideas in his head, and went to work with producer and songwriter Bob Marlette, after spending a few months writing and recording music and experimenting with various different instruments such as live trumpet players, 40 different guitars and vintage keyboards and amplifiers Costa returned to Toronto where he recruited band members for a live band.

Costa recruited members Devon Lougheed, Mykey Thomas and Mick Valentyne to tour and become official members of Smashing Satellites.

SonicAluzion EP & Album 2014-2016

After Costa successfully recruited band members to record and perform with him, the group traveled to Oklahoma to Hinder drummer, Cody Hanson's production studio "Back-Lounge Productions" to record and produce their debut EP and their debut album. Costa befriended Hanson while Costa's former band My Darkest Days toured with Hanson's group Hinder various times before Costa left the band.

On August 18, 2014 the band announced that their debut EP titled "SonicAluzion (A-Side)" will be released September 30, 2014 and that they will be releasing the debut single "Hounds" tomorrow August 19, 2014.

The group toured extensively throughout the Toronto area in support of the EP.

The band also released another single from "A-Side" titled "Waterfall" on February 12, 2015. The single debuted at No. 48 48 on the Billboard's Top 50 Alternative.

On April 14, 2015 Smashing Satellites announced the release of the first single from their debut album titled "What It's All About" and that their debut album "SonicAluzion" will be released June 16, 2015. The album will consist of the 5 songs from their debut EP "SonicAluzion (A-Side) 8 other new tracks.

Smashing Satellites released their debut album SonicAluzion on June 16, 2015 as planned. The album spawned the singles "Hounds", "Waterfall", "What It's All About", "Love Is Forever" and "Living Loud".

Gamblin' Man, White Elephant EP & Retirement 2016-2017

On January 8, 2016 Smashing Satellites released their new single "Gamblin' Man" the single debuted number 38 to the Billboard's top 100 "Hard Rock" tracks for January 2016

On May 26, 2017 the band released "Benny", the lead single for their next EP titled White Elephant.

On October 22, 2017 Costa announced his retirement from the music industry and the end of Smashing Satellites as the result, however Costa stated that he will still release the upcoming "White Elephant" EP as a gift for fans.

Discography
EPs
SonicAluzion (A-Side) (2014)
White Elephant (2017)

Studio Albums
SonicAluzion (2015)

Non-Album Singles
Gamblin' Man (2016) #39 Mainstream Rock Songs

References

Canadian hard rock musical groups
Canadian post-grunge groups
Musical groups from Toronto
Musical groups established in 2014
2014 establishments in Ontario